"Shooting Shark" is a song by American hard rock band Blue Öyster Cult, appearing on the band's ninth album The Revölution by Night. Written by guitarist/vocalist Donald "Buck Dharma" Roeser with lyrics inspired by a Patti Smith poem, the song features a synthesizer-heavy pop sound mixed with rock elements. The song features Randy Jackson, of future American Idol fame, on bass.

The song tells the story of a man in a bad relationship, who wants to be done with the woman. Each time he breaks up with her, everything he sees reminds him of her, and he eventually returns. This has happened three times, and at the end of the song he's returning for the fourth, which he says will be the last.

"Shooting Shark" was a modest success, peaking at #83 on the Billboard Hot 100, as well as #16 on the Billboard Mainstream Rock chart.

Reception
AllMusic reviewer William Ruhlmann picked the song as an Allmusic reviewer's pick. Errol Somay of Rolling Stone noted the song's saxophone solo, stating it "remind[s] us that Blue Öyster Cult are capable songwriters at both ends of the rock & roll Richter scale".

Track listing
American 7" single

American 12" single

European 7" single

UK 12" single

Charts

Personnel
Blue Öyster Cult
 Donald "Buck Dharma" Roeser – vocals, lead guitar, keyboards
 Eric Bloom – rhythm guitar
 Joe Bouchard – bass
 Allen Lanier – keyboards
 Rick Downey – drums

Additional musicians
 Randy Jackson – bass
 Larry Fast – synthesizers, programming
 Marc Baum – saxophone

References

1983 songs
1984 singles
Blue Öyster Cult songs
Columbia Records singles
Songs written by Buck Dharma
Songs written by Patti Smith
Song recordings produced by Bruce Fairbairn
American pop rock songs